The Queensborough River is a perennial river of the Snowy River catchment, located in the Alpine regions of the Australian states of Victoria and New South Wales.

Course and features
The river descends  over its  course.

See also

 List of rivers of New South Wales (L-Z)
 List of rivers of Australia
 Rivers of New South Wales

References

External links
 
 
 

East Gippsland catchment
Rivers of Gippsland (region)
Rivers of New South Wales
Snowy Mountains